Raymond Quigg Lawrence Jr. is an American bishop of the Anglican Church in North America. He was consecrated in 2013 as bishop suffragan in the Atlantic coast network of PEARUSA, which in 2016 became the Anglican Diocese of Christ Our Hope. Since 1989, he has been rector of the Church of the Holy Spirit in Roanoke County, Virginia.

Early life and education
Lawrence was raised in Richmond, Virginia, the oldest of three children. His father, R. Quigg Lawrence Sr., was a Navy veteran and marketer who worked on the creative team that developed the Virginia Is for Lovers campaign. The elder Lawrence was also a recording studio executive who employed a young Bruce Springsteen, and music promoter, and his son worked as security for acts like David Bowie.

Lawrence attended Collegiate School in Richmond, graduating in 1977. He spent two years at the University of Virginia, where he said he majored in "fraternity mayhem." His ambitions to become a doctor frustrated by his alcohol abuse and womanizing, he left UVA and spent 1979 and 1980 working as an EMT and paramedic in Richmond and at the 1980 Winter Olympics in Lake Placid, New York. He came to Christian faith after a fellow surfer gave him a copy of John Stott's Basic Christianity.

Lawrence has said that he received his call to ministry while working as a paramedic:

Lawrence finished his undergraduate degree in emergency medicine at Central Washington University, then enrolled in Virginia Theological Seminary, where he earned his M.Div. Lawrence also met Annette Fleet after completing seminary, and they married in 1986. They have three adult children and seven grandchildren. Lawrence later received a doctorate from Gordon-Conwell Theological Seminary.

Ordained ministry

After graduation, Lawrence was appointed as an associate pastor in Kilmarnock, Virginia. He was released from the job in 1988. In January 1989, he was named the first rector of the Church of the Holy Spirit (CHS), a church plant that had grown out of the Cursillo movement and had just been elevated from mission to parish status in the Episcopal Diocese of Southwestern Virginia. The theologically conservative Lawrence frequently fought with liberalizing elements in the Episcopal Church. “Almost everything was a hill I would die on," Lawrence has said. CHS grew from 45 members to more than 1,400 and spawned multiple church plants in the Roanoke area.

In 1995, an independent 501(c)(3) nonprofit called the Terumah Foundation raised funds to purchase land and construct a 27,000-square-foot facility on Merriman Road in southwest Roanoke County. While CHS used the property, Terumah remained the owner. In 2000, early in the process of the Anglican realignment, Bishop Neff Powell deposed Lawrence and ejected CHS from the Diocese of Southwestern Virginia. The arrangement with Terumah allowed CHS to leave the Episcopal Church without forfeiting the property it used to the diocese. CHS became one of the first U.S. churches to join the Anglican Mission in America, and Lawrence's orders were recognized by the Anglican Church of Rwanda.

Episcopal ministry

Lawrence and CHS joined PEARUSA after its separation from AMIA in order to remain connected with the Anglican Church of Rwanda and the Anglican Church in North America. Lawrence was elected suffragan bishop for PEARUSA's Atlantic coast network, where he would assist Steve Breedlove with care for clergy in the region. He remained rector of CHS.

The Most Rev. Onesphore Rwaje and the Most Rev. Robert Duncan consecrated Lawrence as a bishop on February 4, 2013, at CHS. In 2016, Lawrence and CHS transitioned from PEARUSA to the newly constituted Anglican Diocese of Christ Our Hope, ending the dual canonical residency in the ACNA and Rwanda.

After Todd Atkinson took a leave of absence and was later inhibited over charges of abuse of spiritual authority, Lawrence was in October 2021 appointed interim bishop for Via Apostolica. He remained bishop suffragan in the Diocese of Christ Our Hope and rector at CHS.

In 2021, Lawrence and several CHS members recorded a bluegrass album called Come Home.

References

External links
Church of the Holy Spirit profile page

Living people
21st-century Anglican bishops in the United States
Bishops of the Anglican Church in North America
Year of birth missing (living people)
Anglican realignment people